The 2018 season was the Seattle Seahawks' 43rd in the National Football League (NFL) and their ninth under head coach Pete Carroll. The Seahawks improved on their 9–7 record from the 2017 season, finishing 10–6, the sixth time in seven years that they recorded at least ten wins in a season. They also played in London for the first time in franchise history, defeating the Oakland Raiders 27–3 in Week 6. With a win over the Kansas City Chiefs and eventual league MVP Patrick Mahomes in Week 16, the Seahawks returned to the playoffs; their seventh appearance in the nine seasons under Carroll. However, the Seahawks suffered their first one-and-done postseason campaign since 2004, as they fell to the Dallas Cowboys in the Wild Card round 22–24.

This was the first season since 2011 that the team did not feature the original Legion of Boom defensive unit and did not have Richard Sherman on the roster, as he was released on March 9 and signed with division rival San Francisco 49ers. Michael Bennett, another longtime Seahawk, was traded to the Philadelphia Eagles on March 7. His fellow defensive lineman Cliff Avril was released by the team on May 4. It was also the first season since 2009 that Kam Chancellor was not on the roster; he announced his retirement on July 1 due to the neck injury he sustained in Week 10 of the previous season.

Tight ends Jimmy Graham and Luke Willson, wide receiver Paul Richardson, and running back Thomas Rawls all departed in free agency as well.

On August 20, longtime Seahawks punter Jon Ryan was released from the team. He was the last remaining player from the team before coach Pete Carroll took over in 2010. With his release, the Seahawks shifted the punting duties to their fifth-round rookie Michael Dickson, who went on to make the Pro Bowl and was named First-team All-Pro.

This season is notable for featuring the NFL's first player with only one hand, as the Seahawks drafted Shaquem Griffin in the fifth-round of the 2018 NFL Draft out of the University of Central Florida. He is the twin brother of Seahawks cornerback Shaquill Griffin.

Microsoft co-founder Paul Allen, who had owned the team since 1997, died of Hodgkin's lymphoma on October 15, at the age of 65. Allen also owned the NBA's Portland Trail Blazers from 1988 until his death in 2018. In tribute, the team wore patches labeled "PGA" for the rest of the season beginning at the game against the Detroit Lions.

Draft

Draft trades
The Seahawks traded their second- and seventh-round selections (49th and 235th overall) and wide receiver Jermaine Kearse to the New York Jets for the Jets' seventh-round selection (226th overall) and defensive lineman Sheldon Richardson.
The Seahawks traded their third-round selection (80th overall) and their second-round selection in 2019 to Houston for Houston's fifth-round selection (141st overall) and offensive tackle Duane Brown.
The Seahawks traded their sixth-round selection (192nd overall) and running back Marshawn Lynch to Oakland for Oakland's fifth-round selection (146th overall).
The Seahawks traded their fifth-round selection (156th overall) to Philadelphia for Philadelphia's seventh-round selection (250th overall) and offensive tackle Matt Tobin.
The Seahawks traded defensive end Cassius Marsh to New England for New England's fifth- and seventh-round selections (168th and 250th overall).
The Seahawks traded cornerback Tramaine Brock to Minnesota for Minnesota's seventh-round selection (248th overall).
The Seahawks traded their seventh-round selection (256th overall) to New England for cornerback Justin Coleman.

Staff

Final roster

Notable departures

Preseason

Regular season

Schedule
On January 11, 2018, the NFL announced that the Seahawks will play the Oakland Raiders in a London Game in London, England, with the Raiders serving as the home team. The game site, originally slated for Tottenham Hotspur Stadium, was later moved to Wembley Stadium. The game, which was the Seahawks' first appearance in the International Series,  occurred during Week 6 on October 14. The network time was announced in conjunction with the release of the  regular season schedule.

The remainder of the Seahawks' 2018 schedule, with exact dates and times, was announced on April 19.

Note: Intra-division opponents are in bold text.

Game summaries

Week 1: at Denver Broncos

Week 2: at Chicago Bears

Week 3: vs. Dallas Cowboys

Week 4: at Arizona Cardinals

Week 5: vs. Los Angeles Rams

Week 6: at Oakland Raiders
NFL London Games
With this win, head coach Pete Carroll reached win number 91, becoming the Seahawks' all-time wins leader (including postseason) passing Mike Holmgren with a record of 91-56-1 at that point.

Week 8: at Detroit Lions

Week 9: vs. Los Angeles Chargers

Week 10: at Los Angeles Rams

The Seahawks were swept by the Rams for the first time since 2015.

Week 11: vs. Green Bay Packers

Week 12: at Carolina Panthers

Week 13: vs. San Francisco 49ers

Week 14: vs. Minnesota Vikings

Week 15: at San Francisco 49ers

This was the first time since 2013 that the Seahawks have lost to the 49ers, snapping a ten-game winning streak against the 49ers which dates back to 2013 NFC Championship game.

Week 16: vs. Kansas City Chiefs

With the win, the Seahawks clinched a Wild-Card Berth, which is their first time making the playoffs since 2016. This win also secured their 7th straight winning season dating back to 2012.

Week 17: vs. Arizona Cardinals

With the win, the Seahawks finished the regular season at 10–6, improving on their 9–7 record from last year and securing the No. 5 seed heading into the postseason. They also swept the Cardinals for the first time since 2014.

Standings

Division

Conference

Postseason

NFC Wild Card Playoffs: at (4) Dallas Cowboys

References

External links
 

Seattle
Seattle Seahawks seasons
Seattle Seahawks